Australia is a 2008 epic adventure drama film directed by Baz Luhrmann and starring Nicole Kidman and Hugh Jackman. The screenplay was written by Luhrmann and screenwriter Stuart Beattie, with Ronald Harwood and Richard Flanagan. The film is a character story, set between 1939 and 1942 against a dramatised backdrop of events across northern Australia at the time, such as the bombing of Darwin during World War II.

Production took place in Sydney, Darwin, Kununurra and Bowen. The film was released to cinemas on 26 November 2008 in the United States and in Australia on 26 December 2008, with subsequent worldwide release dates throughout late December 2008 and January and February 2009. Australia received mixed reviews from critics and grossed $211 million worldwide.

Plot
In 1939, weeks before the start of World War II, Lady Sarah Ashley of England travels to Australia to force her philandering husband to sell his faltering cattle station, Faraway Downs. The huge station straddles Western Australia and the Northern Territory, reaching north to the Timor Sea. Her husband sends an independent cattle drover, called "The Drover," to transport her to Faraway Downs.

Lady Sarah's husband is murdered before she arrives; the authorities tell her the killer is an Aboriginal elder nicknamed "King George." The station's manager, Neil Fletcher, secretly tries to gain control of Faraway Downs in order to sell it to meat tycoon Lesley 'King' Carney, thereby creating a complete cattle monopoly. Meanwhile, at Darwin, Australian Army logistics officer Captain Dutton negotiates beef prices with Carney on behalf of the Allies.

The childless Lady Sarah is captivated by the boy Nullah, who has an Aboriginal mother and a white father. Nullah, who has been spying on Fletcher, reveals his plan to Lady Sarah, who fires Fletcher and runs the cattle station aided by her remaining staff. The next day, policemen arrive to take Nullah away to Mission Island as they have with other half-Aboriginal children. While evading them, Nullah's mother Daisy drowns when she hides with him in a water tower. Lady Sarah comforts Nullah by singing the song "Over the Rainbow." Nullah tells her that "King George" is his grandfather, and that like the Wizard of Oz, he, too, is a "magic man".

Lady Sarah persuades Drover to take the cattle to Darwin for sale. Drover leads a team of seven riders, including his Aboriginal brother-in-law Magarri, Goolaj, Nullah, Lady Sarah, Bandy, and the station's accountant Kipling Flynn, to drive the 1,500 cattle to Darwin. They encounter various obstacles along the way, including a fire set by Carney's men that scares the cattle, resulting in the death of Flynn when the group rushes to stop the cattle from stampeding over a cliff. Lady Sarah and Drover fall in love, and she grows to appreciate the Australian territory. The two share a romantic moment under a tree, where he reveals that he was once married to an Aboriginal woman who died after being refused medical treatment in a white hospital. Because he is friendly with the Aboriginals, many of the other whites in the territory shun him. Lady Sarah reveals her inability to have biological children. Over the next few days, the team drives the cattle through the treacherous Never Never desert. Upon finally arriving at Darwin, the group races to load the cattle onto the ship before Carney's cattle in order to secure payment.

Lady Sarah, Nullah, and Drover happily live together at Faraway Downs for two years. Meanwhile, Fletcher manages to take over Carney's cattle empire after orchestrating Carney's death in an accident and marrying his daughter, Catherine, all between 1940 and 1941. He returns to Faraway Downs and threatens Nullah's safety unless Lady Sarah sells her cattle station. Fletcher intimidates her by revealing that he murdered Lady Sarah's husband (not "King George") and that he is also Nullah's father.

Nullah intends to go on a walkabout with "King George," much to Lady Sarah's dismay. She and Drover argue about what is best for Nullah, after which Drover leaves Faraway Downs. Nullah is apprehended by the authorities and sent to live on Mission Island. Lady Sarah, who has come to regard Nullah as her adopted son, vows to rescue him. As World War II escalates, she goes to work as a radio operator alongside Catherine. When the Japanese attack Mission Island and Darwin in 1942, Lady Sarah fears that Nullah has been killed.

Drover returns to Darwin after hearing about the attack. He learns of Nullah's abduction to Mission Island and goes with Magarri, Ivan, and a young Christian brother to rescue him and the other children. During the rescue, Magarri sacrifices himself as a diversion so the others can flee. Meanwhile, Lady Sarah and the other townsfolk are being evacuated South by Captain Dutton. Drover and the children sail into port at Darwin as Nullah plays "Over the Rainbow" on his harmonica; Lady Sarah hears the music and the three are reunited. Fletcher, distraught at his financial ruin and Catherine's death during the Japanese attack, attempts to shoot Nullah with a soldier's rifle. As Lady Sarah and Drover rush to save Nullah, "King George" strikes Fletcher with a spear, killing him.

Lady Sarah, Drover, and Nullah return to the safety of the remote Faraway Downs. Sometime later, "King George" calls out to Nullah, who returns to the Outback with his grandfather as Lady Sarah and Drover look on.

Cast

Nicole Kidman as Lady Sarah Ashley, an English aristocrat who inherits the cattle station Faraway Downs after the death of her husband, Lord Maitland Ashley
Hugh Jackman as The Drover, a drover who helps Lady Sarah Ashley move the cattle across the property
David Wenham as Neil Fletcher, station manager who plans to take Faraway Downs from Lady Sarah Ashley
Bryan Brown as King Carney, a cattle baron who owns much of the land in northern Australia
Jack Thompson as Kipling Flynn, the alcoholic accountant at Faraway Downs
David Gulpilil as King George, a magic tribal elder, grandfather of Nullah
Brandon Walters as Nullah, a young Aboriginal boy whom Lady Sarah Ashley finds at Faraway Downs
David Ngoombujarra as Magarri, the Drover's brother-in-law and best friend
Ben Mendelsohn as Captain Dutton, a Darwin-based Australian Army officer in charge of beef supply
Essie Davis as Catherine Carney, wife of Neil Fletcher and daughter of King Carney
Barry Otto as Administrator Allsop, the Australian government's representative
Kerry Walker as Myrtle Allsop
Sandy Gore as Gloria Carney, King Carney's wife, and Catherine's mother
Ursula Yovich as Daisy, the mother of Nullah
Lillian Crombie as Bandy Legs
Yuen Wah as Sing Song, a Cantonese cook at Faraway Downs
Angus Pilakui as Goolaj, the Drover's second colleague and friend
Jacek Koman as Ivan, the saloonkeeper and innkeeper in Darwin
Tony Barry as Sergeant Callahan, the head of the Northern Territory police
Ray Barrett as Ramsden, an old friendly fellow
Max Cullen as Old Drunk

In addition, Arthur Dignam and Matthew Whittet play the priest and Christian brother, respectively, at Mission Island.

Production
Originally, Baz Luhrmann was planning to make a film about Alexander the Great starring Leonardo DiCaprio and Nicole Kidman, with a screenplay by David Hare. The director had built a studio in the northern Sahara but Alexander made by Oliver Stone was released first and after several years in development, Luhrmann abandoned the project to make a film closer to home. The visual effects were done by Animal Logic and The LaB Sydney. Luhrmann spent six months researching general Australian history. At one point he considered setting his film during the First Fleet, 11 ships that sailed from Britain in 1787 and set up the first colony in New South Wales. The director wanted to explore Australia's relationship with England and with its indigenous population. He decided to set the film between World Wars I and II in order to merge a historical romance with the Stolen Generations, where thousands of mixed-race Aboriginal children were forcibly removed from their families by the state and integrated into white society. Luhrmann has said that his film depicts "a mythologised Australia".

Casting

In May 2005, Russell Crowe and Nicole Kidman entered negotiations to star in an untitled 20th Century Fox project written by director Baz Luhrmann and screenwriter Stuart Beattie, with Luhrmann directing the film. In May 2006, due to Crowe's demanding personal script approval before signing onto the project, Luhrmann sought to replace the actor with Heath Ledger. Crowe said he didn't want to work in an environment that was influenced by budgetary needs. About this casting issue, Luhrmann said, "it was hard pinning [Crowe] down. Every time I was ready, Russell was in something else, and every time he was ready, I would be having another turmoil". The following June, Luhrmann replaced Crowe with actor Hugh Jackman. In January 2007, actors Bryan Brown, Jack Thompson, and David Wenham were cast into Australia. In November 2006, Luhrmann began searching for an actor to play an Aboriginal boy of 8–10 years old and by April 2007, 11-year-old Brandon Walters was cast into the role of Nullah. Academic D. Bruno Starrs has written about how this casting choice and the decision to have the character of Nullah narrate the film reinforce its "left-leaning" message regarding the 'Stolen Generations'.

Pre-production

The untitled project was scheduled to begin production in September 2006, but scheduling conflicts and budget issues postponed the start of production to February 2007. In November 2006, Luhrmann explored The Kimberley to determine the amount of production to be shot there. In December 2006, Bowen was chosen as a filming location for a third of the production, portraying the look of Darwin. Bowen was chosen as a prospect due to the financing of $500,000 by the Queensland government. In April, Kununurra was chosen as another location for Australia, this time to serve as Faraway Downs, the homestead owned by Kidman's character. Entire sets were built from scratch, including a stand-alone set in the Queensland town of Bowen, the re-creation of war scenes near Darwin Harbour, and the construction of an outback homestead in Western Australia.

Costumes
Academy Award-winning costume designer Catherine Martin did extensive research for the film's outfits, studying archival images and newspapers from the 1930s and 1940s Australia. She also interviewed descendants of the original Darwin stockmen in order to find out if they "wore socks with his boots when he rode a horse, that's something you either get through a snapshot, or something you have to go talk to the people who lived there about". The Asian-inspired costumes of the film were intended to evoke the romanticism of the era, and one of the centrepieces of the film's costuming is a red chrysanthemum-printed Chinese cheongsam or qipao that was made for Nicole Kidman's character. The film received an Academy Award nomination for Best Costume Design.

Principal photography
The director planned to begin filming in March 2007. However, principal photography began on 30 April 2007 in Sydney, and Kidman found out that she was pregnant. She instantly withdrew from her next film, The Reader. Afterwards, the production moved to Bowen on 14 May. 

In addition, she worked 14- and 15-hour days while dealing with morning sickness. While shooting in a remote region of Western Australia, the shoot had to be rescheduled when the Faraway Downs set, the homestead central to the film's story, was reduced to mud from torrential rain – the first in 50 years. The cast and crew went back to Sydney to shoot interior scenes until the expensive set dried out. In addition, at one point, the entire country's horses were in lock down over equine flu. Scenes using Darwin harbour were shot in July 2007, with parts of Stokes Hill Wharf blocked to the public and mini buses used to ferry tourists past the film set. 

Filming lasted five months, wrapping up at Fox Studios, Sydney, on 19 December 2007. In late April, Luhrmann titled his project Australia. Two other titles that he considered for the film had been Great Southern Land and Faraway Downs. On 11 August 2008, eight months after filming wrapped, several members of the cast and crew were back at Fox Studios, Sydney, to film pick up shots.

Post-production
Two weeks before the film's premiere, the Daily Telegraph erroneously reported that Luhrmann gave in to studio pressure after "intense" talks with executives and re-wrote and then re-shot the ending of Australia for a happier conclusion after "disastrous reviews" from test screenings. To counter these negative reports, the studio had Jackman and Kidman promoting Australia on The Oprah Winfrey Show, which dedicated an entire episode of the program to the film, and Fox co-chairman Tom Rothman spoke to the Los Angeles Times where he described the Telegraph article as "patently nonsensical. It's all too typical of the way the world works today that everybody picked up an unsourced, anonymous quote-filled story in a tabloid from Sydney and nobody ever bothered to check to see if it was accurate". Rothman also said that Luhrmann had final cut on his film. The director admitted that he wrote six endings in the drafts he authored, and shot three of them.

Soundtrack
David Hirschfelder composed the score to Australia. Interpolated musical numbers include the jazz standards "Begin the Beguine", "Tuxedo Junction", "Sing Sing Sing (With a Swing)", and "Brazil". Edward Elgar's "Nimrod" from "Enigma" Variations is heard in the final scene of the film. Luhrmann hired singer Rolf Harris to record his wobble board for the opening credits, and Elton John composed and performed a song called "The Drover's Ballad", to lyrics by Luhrmann, for the end credits. Also used in the end credits is "By the Boab Tree", a song nominated for a 2008 Satellite Award, again with Luhrmann lyrics, performed by Sydney singer Angela Little. Little's rendition of "Waltzing Matilda" completes the end credits in some versions of the film. The jazz soundtrack to "Australia" was performed by the Ralph Pyle big band with clarinet solos by Andy Firth.

Tourism tie-in
Tourism Western Australia spent $1 million on a campaign linked with the release of Australia in the United States, Canada, Japan, Europe and South Korea that ties in with an international Tourism Australia plan. Concerned about the recession and fluctuating international fuel prices, the tourism industry hoped that Luhrmann's film would deliver visitors from all over the world in the same kind of numbers that came to the country following the 1986 release of Crocodile Dundee, and follow the significant increase in visitors to New Zealand since 2001 after the release of The Lord of the Rings films. Federal Tourism Minister Martin Ferguson said, "This movie will potentially be seen by tens of millions of people, and it will bring life to little-known aspects of Australia's extraordinary natural environment, history and indigenous culture". Tourism Australia worked with Luhrmann and 20th Century Fox on a publicity campaign titled, "See the Movie, See the Country", based on movie maps and location guides, to transform the film into "a real-life travel adventure". In addition, the director made a $50 million series of commercials promoting the country.

Critical reception
Australia received mixed reviews from critics. , the film holds a 55% approval rating on review aggregator Rotten Tomatoes, based on 223 reviews with an average rating of 5.90/10. The site's critical consensus reads, "Built on lavish vistas and impeccable production, Australia is unfortunately burdened with thinly drawn characters and a lack of originality." At Metacritic, which assigns a normalised rating to reviews, the film has a weighted average score of 53 out of 100, based on 38 critics, indicating "mixed or average reviews".

Australian critics
Jim Schembri in The Sydney Morning Herald and The Age (Melbourne) wrote, "The film is fine, and never boring but, boy, is it overlong," and added, "More importantly, local films with black themes or major indigenous characters tend to do poorly, so if Australia succeeds here it could represent a breakthrough. We've always had trouble dealing with racial issues on film, so, in that regard, the film could be a landmark." Claire Sutherland, in her review for the Herald Sun (Melbourne) wrote, "A love letter to the Australian landscape and our history, Australia has international blockbuster written all over it", and Sydney's The Daily Telegraph wrote, "Kidman's screen presence is nothing short of radiant." In his review for The Australian (Sydney), David Stratton wrote, "It's not the masterpiece that we were hoping for, but I think you could say that it's a very good film in many ways. While it will be very popular with many people I think there's a slight air of disappointment after it all. Despite its flaws – and it certainly has flaws – I think Australia is an impressive and important film." Mark Naglazas of The West Australian (Perth) accused positive reviews from News Ltd press outlets of being manipulated by 20th Century Fox, as they are all owned by Rupert Murdoch's News Corporation, calling Australia a film of "unrelenting awfulness" that "lurches drunkenly from crazy comedy to Mills and Boonish melodrama in the space of a couple of scenes".

British critics
Anne Barrowclough of The Times (London) gave the film four out of five stars, and states the film defies expectation and "in what turns out to be a multi-layered story it describes an Australia of the 1940s that is at once compellingly beautiful and breathtakingly cruel". Bonnie Malkin of The Daily Telegraph (London) stated: "Local critics had worried that the much-anticipated film Australia would present to the world a series of time-honoured Antipodean clichés. Their fears were well founded".

U.S. critics
Megan Lehmann, writing in the Hollywood Reporter, said that the film "defies all but the most cynical not to get carried away by the force of its grandiose imagery and storytelling," and it is "much less earnest than the trailer suggests, layered with a thin veneer of camp and a nod and a wink to accompany the requisite Aussie clichés," and the bottom line is "In epic style, Baz Luhrmann weaves his wizardry on Oz." Roger Ebert gave the film three stars out of four, noting "Baz Luhrmann dreamed of making the Australian Gone with the Wind, and so he has, with much of that film's lush epic beauty and some of the same awkwardness with a national legacy of racism." 

David Ansen, in his review for Newsweek, wrote, "Kidman seems to blossom under Luhrmann's direction: she's funny, warm and charming, and the erotic charge between her and the gruff, hunky Jackman is delicious. In a solemn season, Australia bold, kitschy, unapologetic artifice is a welcome respite." In her review for the New York Times, Manohla Dargis wrote, "This creation story about modern Australia is a testament to movie love at its most devout, cinematic spectacle at its most extreme, and kitsch as an act of aesthetic communion."

Andrew Sarris, in his review for the New York Observer, wrote, "Australia is clearly a labor of love, and a matter of national pride. It is also a bit of a mess. I must confess that I might have been harder on Mr Luhrmann's film if I had not remained entranced by Ms. Kidman ever since I first saw her in Phillip Noyce's Dead Calm in 1989; in my opinion, she has lost none of her luster in the 20 years since." In his review for Time, Richard Schickel wrote, "Have you seen everything Australia has on offer a dozen times before? Sure you have. It's a movie less created by director and co-writer Baz Luhrmann than assembled, Dr Frankenstein-style, from the leftover body parts of earlier movies. Which leaves us asking this question: How come it is so damnably entertaining?" 

Joe Morgenstern of the Wall Street Journal, opines that, "In its heart of hearts Australia is an old-fashioned Western—a Northern, if you will—and all the more enjoyable for it." Nick Rogers, of FilmYap, adds that, "Luhrmann mythologized his homeland as American directors like John Ford did with Westerns—dramatic-license exaggerations that pay off in droves." Ann Hornaday, in her review for the Washington Post, wrote, "A wildly ambitious, luridly indulgent spectacle of romance, action, melodrama and revisionism, Australia is windy, overblown, utterly preposterous and insanely [?] entertaining." In her review for Salon.com, Stephanie Zacharek wrote, "The second half of Australia, Luhrmann's attempt to pull off a wartime weeper, is so aggressively sentimental that it begins to feel more like punishment than pleasure. I left Australia feeling drained and weakened, as if I'd suffered a gradual poisoning at the hands of a mad scientist."

Box office and home media sales and streaming
The film had better box office success in overseas markets and a disappointing gross in the United States – a pattern similar to Luhrmann's three previous films. , the film has grossed $211,342,221 in its worldwide releases. In Australia, the film grossed A$6.37 million in its opening weekend, setting the record for the highest grossing opening weekend for an Australian film and bumping the latest James Bond film Quantum of Solace to second place. Australia performed less well in the U.S., where it surprised box office analysts by opening only at #5, behind Quantum of Solace, Twilight, Bolt, and Four Christmases, and grossed $20 million opening weekend. However, Fox officials were reportedly happy with the numbers, as they said they were expecting only an $18 million opening gross for the film. They further pointed out that Baz Luhrmann's other films, like Moulin Rouge!, Strictly Ballroom, and Romeo + Juliet, started slowly and then built momentum. Australia eventually grossed $49,554,002 in the U.S., 23.4% of its total worldwide gross. Australia's ticket sales outside the United States are $161,788,219 from 51 countries. It opened at No. 1 in Spain, France, Australia, and Germany, and at No. 3 in Britain. Australia grossed $37,555,757 at the box office in Australia. The DVD was released in the United States on 3 March 2009, opening at #2, and sold 728,000 units in the opening weekend, translating to revenue of $12.3 million. Australia sold almost two million DVDs in one month, 80% of what the studio predicted it would sell altogether. , Australia had sold 1,739,700 units in the U.S., for a revenue of $27.9 million. Since being released in Australia, the DVD has sold double what the studio expected. Australia is available to stream on Disney+ in Australia.

Television adaptation
In June 2022, 20th Television announced a six-part limited television series titled Faraway Downs, consisting of a serialized version of the film with additional unused footage from the original production. The series will premiere on Hulu in the U.S. and Disney+ Star in Australia and other international markets.

Post-production on Faraway Downs is taking place in Queensland at Brisbane-based studios The Post Lounge and Resin.

Awards and nominations

See also
 Cinema of Australia
 The Sundowners
 The Overlanders

References

External links

 
 
 
 
 
 
 Australia soundtrack (listenable)
 Tourism Australia's campaign produced by Baz Luhrmann
 Slide show of costume designs for Australia by Catherine Martin from The New York Times

2008 films
2008 romantic drama films
2000s historical romance films
2000s adventure drama films
20th Century Fox films
Adventure films based on actual events
Australian adventure drama films
Australian epic films
Australian romantic drama films
Australian war drama films
Australian historical adventure films
Australian historical romance films
Dune Entertainment films
Epic films based on actual events
Films adapted into television shows
Films directed by Baz Luhrmann
Films scored by David Hirschfelder
Films set in 1939
Films set in 1940
Films set in 1941
Films set in 1942
Australian World War II films
Films set in the Northern Territory
Films set in the Outback
Films set on the home front during World War II
Films shot in Sydney
Films with screenplays by Stuart Beattie
Films with screenplays by Ronald Harwood
Historical epic films
Japan in non-Japanese culture
Pacific War films
Romantic epic films
2000s English-language films